The canton of Portet-sur-Garonne is an administrative division of the Haute-Garonne department, southern France. Its borders were modified at the French canton reorganisation which came into effect in March 2015. Its seat is in Portet-sur-Garonne.

It consists of the following communes:
 
Eaunes
Labarthe-sur-Lèze
Lagardelle-sur-Lèze
Pinsaguel
Pins-Justaret
Portet-sur-Garonne
Roques
Roquettes
Saubens
Venerque
Vernet
Villate

References

Cantons of Haute-Garonne
States and territories established in 1997